Maju MRT station is a future underground Mass Rapid Transit station on the Cross Island line (CRL) located in Bukit Timah, Singapore. First announced in September 2022, the station is expected to be completed in 2032 along with the other CRL Phase 2 stations.

History
Maju station was first announced on 20 September 2022 by Transport Minister S Iswaran. The station will be constructed as part of Phase 2 of the Cross Island line (CRL), a  segment spanning six stations from Turf City station to Jurong Lake District station. The station is expected to be completed in 2032.

The announcement of the station drew mixed reactions from residents in the area who live a distance from the future station. Besides the existing institutions, the station does not serve any other amenities including shops or eateries which might make the station inconvenient to use. On the other hand, the dean of the nearby Singapore University of Social Sciences (SUSS) praised that the station would improve transport connections to the school and alleviate traffic congestion on the road.

Details
The station will serve the Cross Island line (CRL) and have an official station code of CR16. It will be located next to Ngee Ann Polytechnic, Singapore institute of Management and Singapore University of Social Sciences. The station would also serve the Sunset Way estate.

References

Bibliography

External links

Proposed railway stations in Singapore
Mass Rapid Transit (Singapore) stations
Railway stations scheduled to open in 2032